Clarke is a surname which means "clerk". The surname is of English and Irish origin and comes from the Latin . Variants include Clerk and Clark. Clarke is also uncommonly chosen as a given name.

Irish surname origin
Clarke is a popular surname in Ireland. The Irish version of the surname is believed to have come from County Galway and County Antrim and spread to County Donegal and County Dublin. The name is derived from the Irish Gaelic sept , meaning "clerk".

English surname origin
Clarke, as well as Clark, is also a widespread surname in England. The English version is of Anglo-Saxon origin and was used in the Middle Ages for the name of a scribe or secretary. The word "clerc", which came from the pre-7th century Old English  (meaning priest), originally denoted a member of a religious order, but later became widespread. In the Middle Ages, virtually the only people who could read and write were members of religious orders, linking the word with literacy. Thus the surname became a popular term for a literate man, particularly for the professional secretary and the scholar. The English surnames Clarke and Clark are spelling variations. Beauclerk is a related surname, from the Anglo-Norman meaning "fine scholar", and the French surname Leclerc is in the same family of names.

People with the surname 
 A. Clarke (Leicestershire cricketer), English cricketer
 Adam Clarke (1760–1832), British biblical scholar
 Adline Clarke, American politician
 A. E. Clarke, architect working in Australia from the 1890s
 Alan Clarke (1935–1990), British TV and film director
 Alf Clarke (1926–1971), English footballer
 Allan Clarke (footballer) (born 1946), English footballer 
 Alexander Ross Clarke (1828–1914), British geodesist
 Ann or Anne Clarke (disambiguation)
 Arianna Clarke (born 1999), Australian rules footballer
 Arthur C. Clarke (1917–2008), English science-fiction author, futurist, inventor and undersea explorer
 Ashley Clarke (1903–1994), British ambassador to Italy, founder of the Venice in Peril Fund
 Austin Clarke (poet) (1896–1974), Irish poet
 Basil Clarke (1879–1947), British writer and newspaper war correspondent
 Bertie Clarke (1918–1993), West Indian cricketer
 Bethia Clarke (1867–1959), British artist
 Bill or Billy Clarke - see William Clarke (disambiguation)
 Bob Clarke (disambiguation)
 Bobbie Clarke (1940–2014), British rock drummer
 Bobby Clarke (born 1949), Canadian ice hockey player
 Brian Clarke (born 1953), British architectural artist and painter
 Brandon Clarke (born 1996), Canadian basketball player
 Bruce B. G. Clarke (born 1943), US Army officer, author and consultant
 Bruce C. Clarke (1901–1988), American general
 Buck Clarke (1933–1988), American jazz percussionist
 C. Clarke (1837 English cricketer), English cricketer
 C. Clarke (Sheffield cricketer), English cricketer
 Caitlin Clarke (1952–2004), American actress
 Cam Clarke (born 1957), American voice actor
 Campbell Clarke (1835–1902), British journalist
 Carter Clarke (1896–1987), American brigadier general
 Catherine Clarke, British historian
 Catherine Goddard Clarke (1900–1968), American Catholic writer and religious community founder
 Cecil Vandepeer Clarke (1897–1961), British soldier and inventor
 Charles Clarke (disambiguation)
 Chris Clarke (disambiguation)
 Claire D. Clarke, American politician
 Clem S. Clarke (1897–1967), American oilman and politician
 Coty Clarke (born 1992), American basketball player in the Israeli National League
 Cyril Clarke (1907–2000), English physician and medical researcher
 Darren Clarke, Northern Irish golfer
 Darren Clarke, Co Louth Gaa Footballer
 David Clarke (disambiguation)
 Dean Clarke (disambiguation)
 Dominic Clarke (born 1997), Australian trampoline gymnast
 Don or Donald Clarke (disambiguation)
 Dora Clarke (1895–1989), English artist
 Doug or Douglas Clarke (disambiguation)
 Drew Clarke, Australian public servant
 Eddie Clarke (musician) (1950–2018), British guitarist and podcaster
 Edith Clarke (1883–1959), American electrical engineer and professor
 Edmund M. Clarke, American computer scientist
 Edward Clarke (disambiguation)
 Edwin Clarke (1919–1996), British neurologist and medical historian
 Ellis Clarke, lawyer, diplomat, Governor General, President of the Republic of Trinidad and Tobago
 Emilia Clarke (born 1986), English actress
 Ernest Clarke (1856–1923), English historian of agriculture
 Eva Clarke (born 1945), British-Czech Holocaust survivor
 Frank Clarke (disambiguation), also Francis and Franklin
 George Clarke (disambiguation)
 Gillian Clarke, Welsh poet
 Goland Vanhalt Clarke, British Army brigadier-general, big game hunter, naturalist
 Gordon Luke Clarke (born 1945), New Zealand-born 1970s fashion designer
 Harold Clarke (disambiguation)
 Harry Clarke (disambiguation)
 Helen Clarke (disambiguation)
 Henri Jacques Guillaume Clarke (1765–1818), Franco-Irish general under Napoleon I
 Henry Clarke (disambiguation)
 Heroy Clarke, Jamaican politician
 Horace Clarke (born 1940–2020), Virgin Islander Major League Baseball player
 Hyde Clarke (1815–1895), English engineer, philologist and author
 Ian Clarke (disambiguation)
 Jacob Augustus Lockhart Clarke, British neurologist
 James Clarke (disambiguation), also Jim Clarke
 Jason Clarke (born 1969), Australian actor
 Jay Clarke (disambiguation)
 Justine Clarke, Australian actress and singer
 Jennie Thornley Clarke (–?), American educator, writer, anthologist
 Jennifer Ward Clarke (1935–2015), British cellist
 Jeremiah Clarke (1674–1707), English baroque composer
 Jeremy Clarke (disambiguation)
 John Clarke (disambiguation)
 Katie Rose Clarke (born 1984), American musical theatre actress
 Kathleen Clarke (1878–1972), Irish political activist
 Kenneth Clarke (born 1940), British politician; Chancellor of the Exchequer
 Lennox Clarke (born 1991), English professional boxer
 Lige Clarke (1942−1975), American LGBT activist, journalist and author 
 Luther W. Clarke (1825–1869), American politician
 Lydia Clarke (1923–2018), American actress and photographer
 Malcolm Clarke (disambiguation)
 Marcus Clarke (1846–1881), Australian novelist
 Mary Clarke (disambiguation)
 Matthew Clarke (disambiguation), also Matt Clarke
 Mary Frances Clarke, Irish-American founder of the Sisters of Charity of the Blessed Virgin Mary
 Maura Clarke (1931–1980), American nun, martyr, killed in El Salvador
 Maurice Gordon Clarke, American football and baseball player and coach
 Megan Clarke, American cancer epidemiologist 
 Michael Clarke (disambiguation), also Mike Clarke
 Mitch Clarke (born 1985), Canadian mixed martial artist
 Mitch Clarke (basketball) (born 1999), Australian basketball player
 Nancy Clarke (entrepreneur) (died 1811 or 1812), Barbadian hotelier and free woman of colour
 Naomi Clarke, (born 1982), New Zealand soccer player
 Nevelle Clarke (born 1996), American football player
 Nig Clarke (1882–1949), American baseball player
 Nobby Clarke (1907–1981), English footballer
 Noel Clarke, (born 1975), British actor, director and screenwriter
 Patrick Clarke, (born 1965), Irish actor, director, producer and screenwriter
 Pauline Clarke (1921–2013), British writer
 Peter Clarke (disambiguation)
 Philip Clarke (disambiguation)
 Powhatan Henry Clarke (1862–1893), United States Army first lieutenant, recipient of the Medal of Honor during the Indian Wars
 Ralph Clarke (mayor) (died 1660), mayor of Chesterfield, 1598
 Rebecca Clarke (disambiguation)
 Richard Clarke (disambiguation)
 Robert Clarke (disambiguation)
 Roger Clarke (disambiguation)
 Rotnei Clarke (born 1989), American basketball player
 Rozlyne Clarke, Australian make-up artist, musical theatre actor and dance music singer
 Ryan Clarke (disambiguation)
 Samuel Clarke (disambiguation)
 Sharon D. Clarke (born 1966), English actress and singer
 Sidney Clarke (1831–1909), American politician
 Stanley Clarke (born 1951), American double bass and bass guitar musician
 Stephen or Steve Clarke - see Stephen Clark (disambiguation)
 Susanna Clarke (born 1959), British novelist (Jonathan Strange & Mr Norrell)
 Sylvester Clarke, (1954–1999), West Indian cricketer
 Sarah Clarke (disambiguation)
 Taylor Clarke (born 1993), American baseball player
 Terrel E. Clarke (1920–1997), American businessman and politician
 Theo Clarke, British Member of Parliament elected 2019
 Theophilus Clarke, English painter
 Tom or Thomas Clarke (disambiguation)
 Troy Clarke (disambiguation)
 Vince Clarke (born 1960), British musician with the band Erasure
 Wayne Clarke (broadcaster) (born 1961), British Christian minister
 Wayne Clarke (footballer) (born 1961), English former footballer
 William Clarke (disambiguation)
 Yvette D. Clarke (born 1964), American politician, member of the United States House of Representatives
 Hannah Clarke/Baxter, Australian sportsperson and murder victim

Fictional characters
 Christian Clarke, in the BBC soap opera EastEnders
 Franklin Clarke, in Agatha Christie's novel The A.B.C. Murders
 Isaac Clarke, main protagonist of the Dead Space video game series
 Linda Clarke, in the BBC soap opera EastEnders
 Roger Clarke (EastEnders), in the BBC soap opera EastEnders
 Ryan Clarke, recurring character in the American television series Legacies
 Shane Clarke, in the Power Rangers Ninja Storm

References 

Occupational surnames
English-language surnames
English-language occupational surnames
Surnames of Irish origin
Surnames of English origin